Captain Gopalaswami Parthasarathy, popularly known as G. Parthasarathy (born 13 May 1940) is a former commissioned officer in the Indian Army (1963-1968) and a diplomat and author. He has served as the High Commissioner of India, Cyprus (1990–92), Ambassador of India to Myanmar, 1992–95, High Commissioner of India to Australia (1995–99) and the High Commissioner of India to Pakistan (1999-2000). Later he was the spokesperson of the Ministry of External Affairs and the Prime Minister's Office.

Early life and background
He graduated with a B.E. Degree in Electrical Engineering from the College of Engineering, Guindy, Madras, (now Chennai) in 1962.

As a diplomat
In 1968, he joined the Indian Foreign Service, and his first diplomatic assignment was as the Third Secretary in the Embassy of India in Moscow from August 1970.  For years he was known in the corridors of South Block (Secretariat Building) as "Chotta GP" ('chotta' is Hindi for small) to distinguish him from his namesake G Parthasarathy one of India's tallest diplomats, who served as India's High Commissioner to Pakistan between 1963 and 1965.

Other fields of work
He currently writes an influential column in The Pioneer, Business Line and Rediff.com, mostly on foreign affairs. 
In July 2018, he was appointed as the Chancellor of Central University of Jammu.

He co-authored a book with ex-Pakistan Foreign Secretary, Humayun Khan. The book, Diplomatic Divide, debates the issues that divide India and Pakistan.

References

External links
 
 

1940 births
Living people
College of Engineering, Guindy alumni
Indian Army officers
Indian columnists
Military theorists
Ministry of External Affairs (India)
Indian military writers
High Commissioners of India to Pakistan
1992
High Commissioners of India to Australia
High Commissioners of India to Cyprus
Foreign policy writers
Writers from Tamil Nadu
Tamil Nadu politicians
Indian political writers
20th-century Indian non-fiction writers
20th-century Indian male writers